Dino Ricardo Kilates (born April 9, 1988), known professionally as Dino Imperial, is a Filipino actor, Club MC, commercial model and radio disk jockey.  He was a member of ABS-CBN's circle of homegrown talents named Star Magic, ABS-CBN's Talent Management & Development Center and starred in Star Magic Presents: Abt Ur Luv.

In 2010, Imperial left Star Magic and joined Viva Artists Agency.  Enrique Gil took over his spot in Star Magic's Gigger Boys segment in ASAP XV.

In his radio career, Imperial currently works with radio station Wave 89.1. In music, he works under his alias DZ SVG (pronounced dizi savage), and is part of the underground hip-hop collective Bawal Clan.

Filmography

Discography

As DZ SVG 
Studio albums

References 

1988 births
De La Salle–College of Saint Benilde alumni
Filipino male child actors
Filipino male models
Filipino radio personalities
Living people
Star Magic
Viva Artists Agency